Actinobacillus rossii is a bacterium. It was first isolated from the vaginas of postparturient sows.

References

Further reading

External links

LPSN
Type strain of Actinobacillus rossii at BacDive -  the Bacterial Diversity Metadatabase

Pasteurellales
Bacteria described in 1990